Wien Quartier Belvedere is a railway station in the fourth district of Vienna, served mainly by Vienna S-Bahn services. Opened in 1962 as the new underground S-Bahn platforms of the Südbahnhof main-line terminus, it was renamed to its present name when Südbahnhof was replaced by the new Hauptbahnhof station complex located further west.

References 

Quartier Belvedere
Austrian Federal Railways
Railway stations in Austria opened in 1962
Railway stations in Austria opened in the 20th century